The 1946 Purdue Boilermakers football team was an American football team that represented Purdue University during the 1946 Big Ten Conference football season.  In their third season under head coach Cecil Isbell, the Boilermakers compiled a 2–6–1 record, finished in last place in the Big Ten Conference with an 0–5–1 record against conference opponents, and were outscored by their opponents by a total of 208 to 97.

Notable players from the 1946 Purdue team included quarterback Bob DeMoss, guard Dick Barwegen, and back Bulbs Ehlers. DeMoss ranked ninth nationally with 59 pass completions, good for 814 yards.

Schedule

Roster

After the season

The 1947 NFL Draft was held on December 16, 1946. The following Boilermakers were selected.

References

Purdue
Purdue Boilermakers football seasons
Purdue Boilermakers football